Wolfgang Lauenstein (born 20 March 1962 in Hildesheim, West Germany) is a German film director, writer and animator.

Biography 
Lauenstein entered the School of Fine Arts in Hamburg, Germany in 1985. While enrolled at the school Lauenstein, together with his twin brother Christoph, created the animated short film Balance. It received an Academy Award in the animated short film category in 1990. The Lauensteins have created a number of animation works for advertising (including station idents for MTV). They also directed and wrote the screenplay for two animated feature films, Luis and the Aliens and Spy Cat (both 2018).

References

Works cited 
 Olivier Cotte (2007) Secrets of Oscar-winning animation: Behind the scenes of 13 classic short animations. (Making of '"Balance"'') Focal Press.

External links
Lauenstein & Lauenstein official site
Bio and filmography at Acme Filmworks
 

1962 births
Living people
Film people from Lower Saxony
German animated film directors
Stop motion animators
Directors of Best Animated Short Academy Award winners
German twins
People from Hildesheim
University of Fine Arts of Hamburg alumni